Center Point High School (CPHS) is a four-year public high school in the Birmingham, Alabama, United States, suburb of Center Point. It is one of fourteen high schools in the Jefferson County School System and was previously known as E.B. Erwin High School. School colors are royal blue and crimson, and the athletic teams are called the Eagles. CPHS competes in AHSAA Class 5A athletics.

Student profile 
Enrollment in grades 9-12 for the 2013-14 school year is 844 students. Approximately 100% of students are African-American. Roughly 90% of students qualify for free or reduced price lunch.

CPHS has a graduation rate of 62%. Approximately 72% of its students meet or exceed proficiency standards in both reading and mathematics. The average ACT score for CPHS students is 13.

Campus 
CPHS was constructed in 2011 at a cost of $44 million and was designed by Evan Terry Associates. The 259,000 square foot building consists of a two‑story academic and administration wing containing the administrative suites, media center, and classrooms; a one‑story activities wing consisting of the cafeteria and kitchen, band and choral space; a 650‑seat auditorium; a 400‑seat physical education gymnasium; and, a 1,500‑seat competition gymnasium and associated storage, classrooms, and locker/shower rooms.  This wing has its own after-hours entrance and lobby, which allows the remainder of the school to be secured for after-hours events.

The school also includes a career/technical wing with a family and consumer sciences lab, an electronics lab and a cosmetology lab where students will be able to work toward a cosmetology license. A media center with a distance learning lab is available for students who need to take courses that are not available at CPHS.

Athletics 
CPHS competes in AHSAA Class 6A athletics and fields teams in the following sports:

 Boys' sports
 Baseball
 Basketball
 Football
 Golf
 Indoor Track & Field
 Outdoor Track & Field
 Soccer
 Wrestling
 Girls' sports
 Basketball
 Cheerleading
 Golf
 Indoor Track & Field
 Outdoor Track & Field
 Softball
 Soccer
 Volleyball

When it was known as E.B. Erwin High School, CPHS won the following AHSAA state championships:
 Girls' basketball (2011)
 Girls' tennis (1991)
 Wrestling (1992)
The varsity football team won area championships in the AHSAA playoffs in 1980, 1988, 1989, 1995, 1996 and 1997.

References

External links
 Center Point High School website
 Center Point High School Football History

High schools in Birmingham, Alabama
Public high schools in Alabama
Schools in Jefferson County, Alabama